Phaedra (minor planet designation: 174 Phaedra) is a sizable, rocky main belt asteroid that was discovered by Canadian-American astronomer James Craig Watson on September 2, 1877, and named after Phaedra, the tragic lovelorn queen in Greek mythology.

The asteroid is orbiting the Sun with a period of 4.84 years and an eccentricity of 0.14. Lightcurve data obtained from Phaedra indicates a rather irregular or elongated body. It has a cross-section size of ~35 km. Photometric observations of this asteroid at the Shadowbox Observatory in Carmel, Indiana, during 2009 gave a light curve with a period of 4.96 ± 0.01 hours. This is consistent with previous studies in 1977, 1988, and 2008. The asteroid's pole of rotation lies just 5–16° away from the plane of the ecliptic.

References

External links
 
 

Background asteroids
Phaedra
Phaedra
S-type asteroids (Tholen)
S-type asteroids (SMASS)
18770902
Phaedra